is a Japanese anime television series produced by Kadokawa Shoten. Thirteen episodes aired between April 6 and June 29, 2014. The series is a parody of the Record of Lodoss War media franchise.

Characters

References

External links
 

Comedy anime and manga
Record of Lodoss War
Studio Deen
Studio Hibari